Loka means world, dimension, plane, abode, and/or place or plane of existence. It is found in Hinduism, Buddhism and Jainism, each which have distinct conceptions of a trailokya.

Loka may also refer to:

Places in Slovenia
 Frankolovo, a settlement in the Municipality of Vojnik (known as Loka ob Tesnici until 1955)
 Iška Loka, a settlement in the Municipality of Ig
 Loka, Šentjernej, a settlement in the Municipality of Šentjernej
 Loka, Starše, a settlement in the Municipality of Starše
 Loka, Tržič, a settlement in the Municipality of Tržič
 Loka, Koper, a settlement in the Municipality of Koper
 Loka pri Dobrni, a settlement in the Municipality of Dobrna
 Loka pri Framu, a settlement in the Municipality of Rače-Fram
 Loka pri Mengšu, a settlement in the Municipality of Mengeš
 Loka pri Zidanem Mostu, a settlement in the Municipality of Sevnica
 Loka pri Žusmu, a settlement in the Municipality of Šentjur
 Mala Loka, Trebnje, a settlement in the Municipality of Trebnje
 Škofja Loka, a town and a municipality (known locally as Loka)
 Stara Loka, part of the town of Škofja Loka
 Velika Loka, Grosuplje, a settlement in the Municipality of Grosuplje
 Velika Loka, Trebnje, a settlement in the Municipality of Trebnje

Other places
 Lokaloka, Suriname, a village in Suriname

Other uses
 "Loka" (song), by Simone & Simaria, 2017

See also
 
 
 Lhoka, now Shannan, a city in Tibet
 Lhokä language or Sikkimese, a Southern Tibetic language
 Loca (disambiguation)
 Loko (disambiguation)
 Lota (name)